Perrine Goulet (born 19 March 1978) is a French politician of La République En Marche! (LREM) who was elected to the French National Assembly on 18 June 2017, representing the department of Nièvre.

Political career
In parliament, Goulet served on the Finance Committee from 2017 until 2020 before moving to the Committee on Social Affairs. In addition to her committee assignments, she is a member of the French-Israeli Parliamentary Friendship Group.

In September 2018, following the appointment of François de Rugy to the government, Goulet announced her candidacy to succeed him as president of the National Assembly; the position instead went to Richard Ferrand. She later endorsed Amélie de Montchalin as a candidate to succeed him as chairman of the LREM parliamentary group; instead, the position went to Gilles Le Gendre. In July 2019, she challenged Le Gendre for the group's leadership; Le Gendre was subsequently re-elected in the first round, with Goulet coming in fourth out of seven candidates.

In late 2020, Goulet left the LREM group and instead joined the MoDem group.

Political positions
In July 2019, Goulet decided not to align with her parliamentary group's majority and became one of 52 LREM members who abstained from a vote on the French ratification of the European Union’s Comprehensive Economic and Trade Agreement (CETA) with Canada.

Other activities
 Radioprotection and Nuclear Safety Institute (IRSN), Member of the Supervisory Board

See also
 2017 French legislative election

References

1978 births
Living people
Deputies of the 15th National Assembly of the French Fifth Republic
La République En Marche! politicians
21st-century French women politicians
People from Nevers
Women members of the National Assembly (France)
Politicians from Bourgogne-Franche-Comté
Deputies of the 16th National Assembly of the French Fifth Republic
Members of Parliament for Nord